Antony Crowther is a former designer, programmer, and musician of Commodore 64 games. During the 1980s he worked for Alligata, Gremlin Graphics and later his own company, Wizard Development.

Career
The first computer game he created was a version of the board game Mastermind, which was written for the PET 4032. Following the acquisition of a VIC-20 Crowther began to learn machine code and wrote several games which he showed to software house Superior Systems.  The company gave him a Commodore 64 on loan which he utilised to produce his first commercial title, Lunar Lander. He gained high status among C64 users in the mid 1980s with his highly prolific output, developing complete professional games in only two weeks.  Crowther teamed up with fellow C64 musician, Ben Daglish, forming W.E.M.U.S.I.C., which stood for "We Make Use of Sound In Computers".

More recently, Crowther has worked on games for consoles such as the PlayStation and Xbox ranges.

List of games

References
MobyGames - Antony Crowther
Legends of the C64 article on Antony 'Tony' Crowther (aka Ratt)

Notes

1965 births
Living people
British computer programmers
Video game composers
British video game designers
Video game programmers